Denmark competed at the 1920 Summer Olympics in Antwerp, Belgium. 154 competitors, 150 men and 4 women, took part in 66 events in 14 sports.

Medalists

Gold
 Stefani Fryland Clausen — Diving, Women's 10m Platform
 Men's Team (Free system) — Gymnastics
 Lars Madsen, Niels Larsen, Anders Petersen, Erik Sætter-Lassen and Anders Peter Nielsen — Shooting, Men's Team 300m military rifle, standing

Silver
 Henry Petersen — Athletics, Pole vault
 Sören Petersen — Boxing, Heavyweight
 Anders Petersen — Boxing, Flyweight
 Gotfred Johansen — Boxing, Lightweight
 Men's Team (Swedish system) — Gymnastics
 Men's Team — Field Hockey
 Niels Larsen — Shooting, Men's 300m free rifle, 3 positions
 Lars Madsen — Shooting, Men's 300m military rifle, standing
 Poul Hansen — Wrestling, Greco-Roman heavyweight

Bronze
 Johannes Eriksen — Wrestling, Greco-Roman light heavyweight

Athletics

18 athletes represented Denmark in 1920. It was the nation's fifth appearance in athletics, a sport in which Denmark had competed each time the country appeared at the Olympics. Henry Petersen took the country's only medal, a silver in the pole vault. This was Denmark's best ever result in athletics at the time, topping Ernst Schulz's bronze from 1900, and remains tied for best result through the 2008 Games.

Ranks given are within the heat.

Boxing 

12 boxers represented Denmark at the 1920 Games. It was the nation's second appearance in boxing. Three boxers advanced to the finals in their weight classes, but none was able to win a gold medal. The three silvers were Denmark's first Olympic boxing medals, and placed the nation in sixth for the boxing medal count in 1920.

Cycling

Six cyclists represented Denmark in 1920. It was the nation's second appearance in the sport. The road cycling team came in fourth in the team time trial, the closest the Danish cyclists had come to a medal in either Games to that point.

Road cycling

Track cycling

Ranks given are within the heat.

Diving

Five divers, three men and two women, represented Denmark in 1920. It was the nation's debut appearance in the sport. Clausen took the nation's only diving medal of the Games, winning the gold in the women's 10 metre platform event.

 Men

Ranks given are within the semifinal group.

 Women

Ranks given are within the semifinal group.

Fencing

Eight fencers represented Denmark in 1920. It was the nation's fifth appearance in the sport—the most of any nation in 1920. The country's best individual result was Osiier's eighth-place finish in the foil, with the best team finish also coming in the foil with a fourth-place showing.

Ranks given are within the group.

Field hockey

Denmark competed in field hockey for the first time. The team took second place in the four-team round robin, losing to Great Britain but defeating Belgium and France.

Football

First round
 Lost to Spain (0-1)
 → Did not advance
 Team roster
 Sophus Hansen, BK Frem (goalkeeper)
 Steen Steensen Blicher, KB
 Christian Grøthan, B 93
 Ivar Lykke, KB
 Nils Middelboe, KB
 Gunnar Aaby, AB
 Bernhard V. Andersen, BK Frem
 Leo Dannin, KB
 Viggo Jørgensen, B 1903
 Alf Olsen, KB
 Michael Rohde, B 93
 Reserve: Paul Berth, AB
 Reserve: Poul Graae, KB
 Reserve: Carl Hansen, B 1903
 Reserve: Jens Jensen, B 1903
 Reserve: Vilhelm Jørgensen, B 1903
 Reserve: Poul Nielsen, ØB
 Reserve: Svend Ringsted, AB
 Reserve: Fritz Tarp, B 93
 Reserve: Samuel Thorsteinsson, AB
Head coach: Jack Carr

Gymnastics

Forty-five gymnasts represented Denmark in 1920. It was the nation's fourth appearance in the sport. Denmark sent teams in two out of the three team events, but no individual all-around competitors. The Danish gymnasts took the gold medal in the free system and the silver medal in the Swedish system.

Artistic gymnastics

Modern pentathlon

Four pentathletes represented Denmark in 1920. It was the nation's second appearance in the sport, having competed at both instances of the Olympic modern pentathlon.

A point-for-place system was used, with the lowest total score winning.

Rowing

A single rower represented Denmark in 1920. It was the nation's second appearance in the sport. Denmark's lone sculler placed second in his quarterfinal heat, not advancing to the semifinals.

Ranks given are within the heat.

Shooting

Fifteen shooters represented Denmark in 1920. It was the nation's fifth appearance in the sport as well as the Olympics; Denmark was one of three nations (along with France and Great Britain) to have competed in each edition of the Olympic shooting events to that point. With a victory in the standing military rifle, Denmark took its first gold in shooting since 1900. Larsen and Madsen (both among the members of that five-man team) also added a silver medal each.

Tennis

Three tennis players, one man and two women, competed for Denmark in 1920. It was the nation's second appearance in the sport. The team won no medals, but the mixed pair of Hansen and Tegner took fourth place after winning two matches to advance to the semifinals before losing there and in the bronze medal match.

Weightlifting

Five weightlifters, one in each weight class, represented Denmark in 1920. It was the nation's second appearance in the sport, having competed in 1896 but not in 1900. Ejnar Jensen had the best result, placing fourth in the unlimited heavyweight class.

Wrestling

Ten wrestlers competed for Denmark in 1920. It was the nation's third appearance in the sport. All of the Danish wrestlers competed in Greco-Roman wrestling, with none participating in the freestyle competitions. Hansen was the only Dane to win a medal match, taking the heavyweight silver. Eriksen also won a bronze medal, after losing the silver medal match in the only weight class in which no bronze tournament was held. Frisenfeldt reached a silver medal final, while Torgensen reached a bronze match; both lost those matches.

Greco-Roman

References

 
 
International Olympic Committee results database

Nations at the 1920 Summer Olympics
1920
Olympics